The 1932 All-Ireland Minor Hurling Championship was the fifth staging of the All-Ireland Minor Hurling Championship since its establishment by the Gaelic Athletic Association in 1928.

Kilkenny entered the championship as the defending champions.

On 2 October 1932 Tipperary won the championship following an 8–6 to 5–1 defeat of Kilkenny in the All-Ireland final. This was their second All-Ireland title.

Results

All-Ireland Minor Hurling Championship

Semi-finals

Final

Championship statistics

Miscellaneous

 The All-Ireland semi-final is the very first championship meeting between Galway and Tipperary.

External links
 All-Ireland Minor Hurling Championship: Roll Of Honour

Minor
All-Ireland Minor Hurling Championship